West Sixth Street Historic District is a national historic district located at Erie, Erie County, Pennsylvania.  It includes 100 contributing buildings built between 1821 and 1930, with most built after 1883.  They are primarily high-style residences along the "Millionaires Row" and in a variety of popular architectural styles including Eclectic Victorian, Second Empire, and Tudor Revival.  Notable non-residential buildings include the Erie County Courthouse. Located in the district and separately listed are the Charles Manning Reed Mansion, John Hill House, and Watson-Curtze Mansion.

It was added to the National Register of Historic Places in 1984.

References

External links
 Reed Mansion, West Sixth & Peach Streets, Erie, Erie County, PA: 17 photos and 4 data pages, at Historic American Buildings Survey

Historic American Buildings Survey in Pennsylvania
Historic districts on the National Register of Historic Places in Pennsylvania
Tudor Revival architecture in Pennsylvania
Second Empire architecture in Pennsylvania
Buildings and structures in Erie, Pennsylvania
Historic mansion districts
National Register of Historic Places in Erie County, Pennsylvania